Masautso Nkhoma (born March 17, 1986) known professionally as Ruff Kid is a Zambian rapper and songwriter. He debuted in 2004 with his single Wekatemwikwa. Because of the rough childhood he went through, he decide to name himself Ruff Kid,a name that will always depict and remind him of his hard life as an adolescent.
In 2012 he won a BEFFTA award in the category of best international act beating out other African music heavy weights such as  Zahara, Camp Mulla, Cover Driver, D’banj and Grace Galaxy

Early life 

Masautso Nkhoma was Born in 1986  in Kitwe, and was raised in Cha cha cha township of Kitwe. Ruff Kid was raised by his mother, Getrude Nkhoma, as a single parent. He attended Machona Primary School from Grade 1-4, the later attended Nyanje Basic 4-7. His family later moved to Lusaka where he was enrolled at Lusaka Boys Secondary School from grade 8-9. He completed his high school at Chongwe Secondary School. While in his third grade, the music of Tu-pac Shakur influenced him to get into rap. In 2000 he met Mainza who helped him record his frist single "Wekatemwika"

Music career

2004–2012: Early years

Ruff Kid's music career started in 2000 but his first single, Wekatemwika, only got to be released in 2004. The song was an immediate success earning him the number 1 spot on the African international music charts on Channel O and on the Urban Massive show. The same year Dream records released his debut album "All 4 U". His second studio album Matured was later released the following year with Joe Chibungu as his producer. Ruff Kid's second album gave him the opportunity to tour Southern Africa, there by performing with some of the industry greats such as Kabelo Mabalane, Oliver Mtukudzi, Yvonne Chaka Chaka, Jozi, and Zola. He then released his third album “Most Wanted” in 2006. The album had some controversial hits such as Chikalalila. The song caused some controversy not only in Zambia, but also in other neighbouring countries, as the song seemed to reveal some damning truths about a number of artists' private lives. In 2007 Ruff kid won multiple awards namely the Born N'Bred Award(s) (in the category of Best Hip-hop video), CBC Music video Award, Radio Awards. In 2012 he added to his list of achievements when he scoped the BEFFTA Awards in the category best international act beating out other African music heavy weights such as  Zahara, Camp Mulla, Cover Driver, D’banj and Grace Galaxy.

2015-present

After a long sabbatical from music, he released a number of singles namely; Hule which featured Chef 187, Mwaiseni and Lesa Wamaka. He described the latter as a "testimony of God’s Grace" on his life. The song got a lot of public praise as it resonated with the masses.
In 2021, he released his much acclaimed Trap anthem Banja(Which is the literal translation of family in Zambian language), which featured South African rapper Emtee, with which he continued his international foot print. Critics described the songs as "a perfect blend of the genre".
In 2022, he was nominated for the South African Hip Hop Awards in the category of Best International Act, along with other big hip hop names like Kendrick Lamar, Dax and others.

Discography

Studio albums
All 4 U  All - 2004
Matured - 2006
Most Wanted - 2007
Naked Truth - 2013

References

Living people
21st-century Zambian male singers
1986 births
People from Lusaka